Vico d'Arbia is a village in Tuscany, central Italy, in the comune of Siena, province of Siena. At the time of the 2001 census its population was 29.

Vico d'Arbia is about 15 km from Siena.

References 

Frazioni  of Siena